Edmonton Mill Creek was a provincial electoral district in Alberta, Canada, mandated to return a single member to the Legislative Assembly of Alberta using the first past the post method of voting from 1997 to 2019.

History
Edmonton-Mill Creek electoral district was created in the 1996 boundary redistribution from the old electoral district of Edmonton-Avonmore and a small part of Edmonton-Gold Bar electoral districts, and named for the Mill Creek Ravine which runs through Edmonton. The 2010 electoral boundary re-distribution saw the riding boundaries shift southwards. The 2003 south boundaries which ended at 23 Avenue were moved further south into Edmonton-Mill Woods and Edmonton-Ellerslie to end at Anthony Henday Drive. The northern boundaries of the riding were also pushed south from 92 Avenue to the Sherwood Park Freeway at its most northern point.

The district was abolished in 2017 when the Electoral Boundaries Commission recommended renaming Edmonton-Mill Creek to Edmonton-Meadows, reflecting a change in boundaries that "leaves the part of Mill Creek most well-known to Edmontonians in the constituency of Edmonton-Gold Bar".

Boundary history

Electoral history
The electoral district was created in 1997 largely from the old electoral district of Edmonton-Avonmore. That district had become a swing riding through the 1980s and 90s being won by candidates from three different parties. The incumbent Gene Zwozdesky had previously represented Avonmore winning his first term in office in 1993.

Zwozdesky won his first term representing Mill Creek as a Liberal candidate. A year later in 1998 he had a high-profile falling out with the Liberal party and left the caucus to sit as an Independent. He joined the Progressive Conservative caucus a short time later and was re-elected under that banner in 2001.

Starting in 1999 Zwozdesky was appointed to his first portfolio as a junior minister. In total he has held six different ministerial portfolios in the governments of Ralph Klein and Ed Stelmach with his last portfolio ending in 2011. Zwozdesky was defeated in the 2015 Alberta general election by Alberta NDP candidate Denise Woollard.

Legislature results

1997 general election

2001 general election

2004 general election

2008 general election

2012 general election

2015 general election

Senate nominee results

2004 Senate nominee election district results

Voters had the option of selecting 4 candidates on the ballot.

2012 Senate nominee election district results

Student vote results

2004 election

On November 19, 2004, a student vote was conducted at participating Alberta schools to parallel the 2004 Alberta general election results. The vote was designed to educate students and simulate the electoral process for persons who had not yet reached the legal majority. The vote was conducted in 80 of the 83 provincial electoral districts, with students voting for actual election candidates. Schools with a large student body that reside in another electoral district had the option to vote for candidates outside of the electoral district than where they were physically located.

2012 election

See also
List of Alberta provincial electoral districts
Mill Creek Ravine, a creek located in Edmonton, Alberta, and a part of the River Valley parks and trail system

References

Further reading

External links
Elections Alberta
The Legislative Assembly of Alberta

Former provincial electoral districts of Alberta
Politics of Edmonton